Prima Simpatiaji (born 16 October 1981) is a former professional tennis player from Indonesia.

Biography
A right-handed player, Simpatiaji featured in twelve Davis Cup ties for Indonesia from 2003 to 2009. All of his 20 matches were in singles.

Simpatiaji represented Indonesia at tennis in various multi-sport competitions during his career. He won a total of six medals at the Southeast Asian Games, including team gold in 2003, as well as a silver at the 2005 Islamic Solidarity Games and a bronze at the 2007 Summer Universiade, both in the men's doubles.

Since retiring from the tennis circuit he has taken up the sport of soft tennis. At the 2011 Southeast Asian Games he won singles, doubles and team gold in his adopted sport. He also competed in soft tennis at the 2014 Asian Games and won a bronze medal in the mixed doubles.

See also
List of Indonesia Davis Cup team representatives

References

External links
 
 
 

1981 births
Living people
Indonesian male tennis players
Soft tennis players at the 2014 Asian Games
Soft tennis players at the 2018 Asian Games
Asian Games bronze medalists for Indonesia
Asian Games medalists in soft tennis
Medalists at the 2014 Asian Games
Medalists at the 2018 Asian Games
Southeast Asian Games gold medalists for Indonesia
Southeast Asian Games silver medalists for Indonesia
Southeast Asian Games bronze medalists for Indonesia
Southeast Asian Games medalists in tennis
Universiade medalists in tennis
Competitors at the 2003 Southeast Asian Games
Competitors at the 2011 Southeast Asian Games
Universiade bronze medalists for Indonesia
Medalists at the 2007 Summer Universiade
Southeast Asian Games medalists in soft tennis
Islamic Solidarity Games competitors for Indonesia
Islamic Solidarity Games medalists in tennis
20th-century Indonesian people
21st-century Indonesian people